The Cemetery of Montmartre is a cemetery in the 18th arrondissement of Paris, France, that dates to the early 19th century. Officially known as the Cimetière du Nord, it is the third largest necropolis in Paris, after the Père Lachaise Cemetery and the Montparnasse Cemetery.

History
In the mid-18th century, overcrowding in the cemeteries of Paris had created numerous problems, from impossibly high funeral costs to unsanitary living conditions in the surrounding neighborhoods. In the 1780s, the Cimetière des Innocents was officially closed and citizens were banned from burying corpses within the city limits of Paris. During the early 19th century, new cemeteries were constructed outside the precincts of the capital: Montmartre in the north, Père Lachaise Cemetery in the east, Passy Cemetery in the west and Montparnasse Cemetery in the south.

The Montmartre Cemetery was opened on 1 January 1825. It was initially known as le Cimetière des Grandes Carrières (Cemetery of the Large Quarries). The name referenced the cemetery's unique location, in an abandoned gypsum quarry. The quarry had previously been used during the French Revolution as a mass grave. It was built below street level, in the hollow of an abandoned gypsum quarry located west of the Butte near the beginning of Rue Caulaincourt in Place de Clichy. As is still the case today, its sole entrance was constructed on Avenue Rachel under Rue Caulaincourt.

A popular tourist destination, Montmartre Cemetery is the final resting place of many famous artists who lived and worked in the Montmartre area. See the full list of notable interments below.

A
 Adolphe Adam (1803–1856), composer
 Yvette Alde (1911–1967), painter
 Charles-Valentin Alkan (1813–1888), composer
 André-Marie Ampère (1775–1836), physicist (namesake of electrical unit ampere)
 Édouard André (1840–1911), landscape architect
 Juan Crisóstomo Arriaga (1806–1826), composer
 Alfred-Arthur Brunel de Neuville (1852–1941), painter

B
 Benjamin Ball (physician) (1833–1893), psychiatrist
 Michel Berger (1947–1992), composer, singer
 Hector Berlioz (1803–1869), composer (originally buried in a less prominent plot in the same cemetery)
 Léon Boëllmann (1862–1897), composer and organist
Alexandre Boëly (1785–1858), composer and organist
 Mélanie "Mel" Bonis (1858–1937), composer
 François Claude Amour, marquis de Bouillé (1739–1800), royalist general named in the French National Anthem, La Marseillaise
 Lili Boulanger (1893–1918), composer
 Nadia Boulanger (1887–1979), composer
 Georges Hilaire Bousquet (1846–1937), jurist, legal scholar
 Marcel Boussac (1889–1980), entrepreneur
 Giuseppina Bozzacchi, (1853–1870), ballerina
 Victor Brauner (1903–1966), painter
 Václav Brožík (1851–1901), Czech painter
 Alfred-Arthur Brunel de Neuville (1852–1941), painter
 Myles Byrne (1780–1862), Irish revolutionary soldier

C

 Moïse de Camondo (1860–1935), banker
 Nissim de Camondo (1892–1917), banker, World War I pilot
 Aimée Campton (1882–1930), actress 
 Pierre Cardin (1922–2020), Fashion Designer
 Marie-Antoine Carême (1784–1833), famed inventor of classical cuisine
 Louis-Eugène Cavaignac (1802–1857), politician
 Fanny Cerrito (1817–1909), Italian ballerina
 Philippe (Zdar) Cerboneschi (1967–2019), music producer, dj (Cassius_(band))
 Jean-Martin Charcot (1825–1893), neurologist
 Jacques Charon (1920–1975), actor
 Théodore Chassériau (1819–1856), painter
 Henri-Georges Clouzot (1907–1977), director and screenwriter
 Véra Clouzot (1913–1960), actress

D

 Henri-Bernard Dabadie (1797–1853), operatic baritone
 Louise-Zulmé Dabadie (1795–1877), operatic soprano 
 Dalida (1933–1987), Egyptian-born Italo-French singer and actress, singing diva.
 Louis Antoine Debrauz de Saldapenna (1811–1871), Austrian writer and diplomat
 Edgar Degas (1834–1917), Impressionist painter, sculptor
 Léo Delibes (1836–1891), composer of Romantic music
 Maria Deraismes (1828–1894), social reformer, feminist
 Narcisse Virgilio Díaz (1808–1876), painter
 William Didier-Pouget (1864–1959), artist painter
 Maxime Du Camp (1822–1894), author
Norbert Dufourcq (1904–1990), organist, musicologist, writer
 Alexandre Dumas, fils (1824–1895), novelist, playwright
 Marie Duplessis (1824–1847), courtesan, La Dame aux Camélias
 François Duprat (1941–1978), assassinated political radical

F

 Renée Jeanne Falconetti (1892–1946), actress, notable for La Passion de Jeanne d'Arc.
 Georges Feydeau (1862–1921), playwright of La Belle Époque
 Léon Foucault (1819–1868), scientist
 Charles Fourier (1772–1837), utopian socialist
 Christopher Fratin (1801–1864), animalier sculptor
 Carole Fredericks (1952–2001), African-American singer

G

 France Gall (1947–2018), singer
 Theophile Gautier (1811–1872), poet, novelist
 Jean-Léon Gérôme (1824–1904), painter
 Eugène Gigout (1844–1925), composer and organist
 José Melchor Gomis (1791–1836), Spanish Romantic composer
 Edmond de Goncourt (1822–1896), author/publisher, brother of Jules (patron of the Prix Goncourt)
 Jules de Goncourt (1830–1870), author/publisher, brother of Edmond and buried in the same grave. Also patron of the Prix Goncourt 
 Amédée Gordini (1899–1979), Gordini sports car manufacturer
 La Goulue (Louise Weber) (1866–1929), Can-can dancer (she was originally buried in the Cimetière de Pantin)
 Jean-Baptiste Greuze (1725–1805), artist
 Béla Grünwald (1839–1891), Hungarian historian and politician
 Jules Guérin (1860–1910), nationalist political radical 
 Lucien Guitry (1860–1925), actor
 Sacha Guitry (1885–1957), actor/director
 Charles Gumery (1827–1871), sculptor

H

 Fromental Halévy (1799–1862), composer
 Heinrich Heine (1797–1856), German poet
 Fanny Heldy (1888–1973), Belgian soprano
 Jacques Ignace Hittorff (1792–1867), architect

I
François-André Isambert (1792–1857), lawyer, historian, and politician

Daniel Iffla (1825–1907), Jewish philanthropist and financier

J
 Maurice Jaubert (1900–1940), composer, conductor
 André Jolivet (1905–1974), composer
 Marcel Jouhandeau (1888–1979), author
 Louis Jouvet (1887–1951), actor
 Anna Judic (1850–1911), actress, chanteuse
 Antoine-Henri Jomini (1779–1869), general, military author

K

 Friedrich Kalkbrenner (1784–1849), pianist, composer
 Miecislas Kamieński, a Polish soldier who was a volunteer in the French Army and was killed in the Battle of Magenta, mentioned because the statue by Jules Franceschi on his grave is well known
 Julian Klemczyński, (1807 or 1810–1851?), pianist, composer
 Marie-Pierre Kœnig (1898–1970), Free French Field Marshal
 Bernard-Marie Koltès (1948–1989), playwright, director
 Joseph Kosma (1905–1969), composer
 Slavko Kopač (1913–1995), Croatian-French painter, sculptor and poet

L

 Eugène Labiche (1815–1888), dramatist
 Dominique Laffin (1952–1985), actress
 Charles Lamoureux (1834–1899), violinist
 Jean Lannes (1769–1809), Marshal of France (heart-burial only, the body is in the Pantheon)
 Jules Joseph Lefebvre (1836–1911), painter
 Margaret Kelly Leibovici (1910–2004), "Miss Bluebell", Irish dancer
 Frédérick Lemaître (1800–1876), actor
 Pauline Leroux (1809–1891), dancer
 Élisabeth Leseur (1866–1914), mystic
 José Yves Limantour (1854–1935) Mexican Secretary of Finance
 Emma Livry (1842–1863), ballet dancer
 Édouard Lucas (1842–1891), mathematician

M
 Aimé Maillart (1817–1871), composer
 Henri Meilhac (1830–1897), dramatist
 Mary Marquet (1895–1979), actress
 Victor Massé (1822–1884), composer
 Joseph Porter Michaels (1838–1912), American dentist, professor at the Dental School of Paris, he collaborated with Professor Péan for the creation of the first shoulder prosthesis
 Auguste de Montferrand (1786–1858), architect
José María Luis Mora (1794–1850), Mexican politician
 Gustave Moreau (1826–1898), symbolist painter
 Jeanne Moreau (1928–2017), actress
 Aimé Morot (1850–1913), academic art painter 
 Henri Murger (1822–1861), novelist
 Musidora (1889–1957), (Jeanne Roques) actress/director/writer

N

 Vaslav Nijinsky (1890–1950), ballet dancer
 Adolphe Nourrit (1802–1839), tenor
 Eugène Nyon (1812–1870), playwright and novelist
 Alphonse de Neuville (1836–1885), painter whose funerary monument was realized by Francis de Saint-Vidal

O

 Jacques Offenbach (1819–1880), French composer of German descent
 Georges Ohnet (1848–1919), writer
 Harriet Osborne O'Hagan (1830–1921), Irish portrait artist

P
Théophile-Jules Pelouze (1807–1867), chemist
Isaac Péreire (1806–1880), financier
Jacob Rodrigues Péreire (1715–1780), educator
Francis Picabia (1879–1953), painter
Alphonsine Plessis (1824–1847), La Dame aux Camélias
Patrick Pons (1952–1980), motorcycle racer
Pierre Alexis Ponson du Terrail (1829–1871), novelist
Jean Le Poulain (1924–1988), actor
Francisque Poulbot (1879–1946), painter, illustrator
Olga Preobrajenska (1871–1962), ballet dancer (according to other sources, she is buried in the Sainte-Geneviève-des-Bois Russian Cemetery)

R
 Juliette Récamier (1777–1849), socialite and woman of letters
 Salomon Reinach (1858–1932), archaeologist
 Ernest Renan (1823–1892), writer (buried in the Ary Scheffer grave)
 Jacques Rigaut (1898–1929), poet
 Jacques Rivette (1928–2016), film director and film critic
 Henri Rivière (1827–1883), naval officer, writer
 Jean Rédélé (1922–2007), automotive pioneer, pilot and founder of the French automotive brand Alpine.
 Julie Rodde (1818–1900), French writer, poet and journalist.
 Hilda Roosevelt (1881–1965), opera singer, daughter of Cornelius Roosevelt (1847–1902)
 Endre Rozsda (1913–1999), surrealist painter

S

 Joseph Isidore Samson (1793–1871), actor and playwright
 Henri Sauguet (1901–1989), composer
 Adolphe Sax (1814–1894), musical instrument artisan (inventor of saxophone)
 Ary Scheffer (1795–1858), painter
 Cornélia Scheffer (1830–1899), sculptor and designer
 Helen G. Scott (1915–1987), Truffaut / Hitchcock 
 Philippe Paul de Ségur, Count of Ségur (1780–1873), historian
 Claude Simon (1913–2005), novelist
 Juliusz Słowacki (1809–1849), Polish romantic poet
 Harriet Smithson (1808–1854), Anglo-Irish actress, the first wife of Hector Berlioz, and the inspiration for his Symphonie fantastique
 Fernando Sor (1778–1839), guitarist
 Alexandre Soumet (1788–1845), poet
 Stendhal (Marie-Henri Beyle) (1783–1842), writer
 Charles Henri Sanson (1739–1806), executioner of Louis XVI

T

 Marie Taglioni (1804–1884), ballerina
 Ludmilla Tchérina (1924–2004), dancer, actress and painter
 Ambroise Thomas (1811–1896), opera composer
 Armand Toussaint (1806–1862), sculptor
 Jean-Pierre Travot (1767–1836), general
 Constant Troyon (1810–1865), painter
 François Truffaut (1932–1984), French New Wave filmmaker and director

V
 Horace Vernet (1789–1863), painter
 Auguste Vestris (1760–1842), dancer
 Gaétan Vestris (1729–1808), dancer
 Pauline Viardot (1821–1910), opera singer, composer
 Alfred de Vigny (1797–1863), poet, playwright, novelist
 Jean-Baptiste Vuillaume (1798–1875), luthier

W
 René Waldeck-Rousseau (1846–1904), politician
 Walenty Wańkowicz (1799–1842), painter
 Georges-Fernand Widal (1862–1929), bacteriologist

Z
 Émile Zola (1840–1902), author (original site, moved to the Panthéon in 1908). The Zola family grave is still there, with Émile's name on it.

See also
 Saint-Vincent Cemetery in Montmartre

References

External links

 Official website
 
 Cimetiere de Montmartre (in French)
 Links and Images Collection of resources
 Google Maps
 Written in Stone – Burial locations of literary figures.
 Montmartre cemetery information In English
 Photos of Montmartre Documenting funerary statuary in Paris cemeteries; on pariscemeteries.com

Cemeteries in Paris
Montmartre
 
Buildings and structures in the 18th arrondissement of Paris